Duncan of Scotland  may refer to:

 Duncan I of Scotland (died 1040), king of Scotland
 Duncan II of Scotland (died 1094), king of Scotland